Chiller is a light gun arcade game released in 1986 by Exidy. An unlicensed port was released for the Nintendo Entertainment System in 1990 by American Game Cartridges in the US, and in Australia by HES (Home Entertainment Suppliers), with the option of using either the standard controller or the NES Zapper.

In the game, the player takes on the role of an unseen torturer who must maim, mutilate, and murder restrained non-player characters in a variety of dungeon settings. Few of the NPCs in the game are capable of fighting back, with the challenge element lying in how quickly the player can cause each of the victims to die.

Gameplay 

The game consists of four main levels: the torture chamber, the rack room, the haunted house hallway, and the graveyard. If enough score is accumulated by completing these levels successfully, a final bonus round is unlocked, which consists of a target practice where objects traveling at increasingly high speeds must be shot. Between each level, a bonus score can be obtained by winning at the slot machine.

The first two levels feature seemingly human NPCs restrained by medieval torture devices. The player must discover how to kill these characters in the shortest possible amount of time. Although it is possible to shoot them to death, this process is inefficient as direct shots only result in chunks of flesh being blown away, leaving the victims alive. Instead, the challenge lies in finding ways to activate the torture devices, resulting in quicker and bloodier deaths.

After the first two levels, the game transitions into a more traditional shooting game; the player must kill paranormal creatures, such as zombies, ghosts, and mummies.

Reception 

The game sold poorly in the United States because arcade owners refused to purchase it; Exidy successfully marketed it to third world countries. Modern reviewers often criticize the game for its senseless violence and encouraging the torture and murder of apparently innocent people, as opposed to the gamer fighting enemies capable of defending themselves.

References

External links 

1986 video games
Arcade video games
Exidy games
Unauthorized video games
1980s horror video games
Light gun games
Nintendo Entertainment System games
Obscenity controversies in video games
Video games developed in the United States
Video games set in castles
Video games set in cemeteries
American Game Cartridges games